This list shows the recipients of the title National Hero of Azerbaijan.

1992

1993

1994

1995

1996

2009

2010

2016

2017

References

Lists of Azerbaijani people
Nagorno-Karabakh